Antero Junction is a ghost town in Park County, Colorado, United States. Antero Junction is along U.S. Route 285; and U.S. Route 24.

The community takes its name from Mount Antero.

See also

 List of ghost towns in Colorado

References

External links

Former populated places in Park County, Colorado
Ghost towns in Colorado
Road junctions in the United States